Pin Art or Pinscreen is an executive toy patented in 1987 by Ward Fleming. It consists of a boxed surface made of a crowded array of pins that are free to slide in and out independently in a screen to create a three-dimensional relief. Other similar product names are "PinPressions" and "Pinhead". The original Pinscreen toys were made of metal pins, which were heavier and tended to bend easily; newer Pinscreen toys are generally made of plastic pins. Pinscreens have also been used for animation production; a larger device working on a similar principle was invented by Claire Parker in 1935. 

A giant 4' × 8' pinscreen is at the Swiss Science Center Technorama in Winterthur, Switzerland. This screen is like a large 3D drawing pad that can work with different sizes of paintbrushes for calligraphy.

In popular culture
 The pinscreen was popularized in the 1985 music video for the Midge Ure song "If I Was", which included a giant body-sized version.
 In the 1988 film Vice Versa, Marshall Seymour keeps a pinscreen on his office desk. Charlie (Judge Reinhold) pushes his face into it and sticks out his tongue.
 In the 1990 film Darkman, a pinscreen is used to duplicate a character's hand.
 In  Tiny Toon Adventures, Elmyra (Voiced by Cree Summer) is seen using a pinscreen on her belly.
 A 1997 Coca-Cola ad, directed by Industrial Light & Magic, involves the use of a computer-generated imagery pinscreen.
 The 1999 film Toy Story 2 features a pinscreen that Buzz Lightyear is pushed into whilst fighting another Buzz Lightyear model.
 In the 2000 film X-Men, a computerized pinscreen displaying a model of New York City is used by the X-Men to plan an attack against Magneto.
 A digitally produced pinscreen is featured in the 2005 music video for the Nine Inch Nails song "Only", directed by David Fincher.
 Similar to "Only," a digitally produced pinscreen is featured in the 2008 music video for the Eagles of Death Metal song "Wannabe in LA".
 A 2007 advertising campaign by the Discovery Channel involved a pinscreen forming various images, such as that of the Sydney Opera House and whales.
 The 2013 film Man of Steel involves several CG pinscreens which serve as personal computers on Kal-El's homeworld of Krypton.
 In the 2021 film The Matrix Resurrections Morpheus saves the day as a CG pinscreen.

References 

1980s toys
Executive toys
Pinscreen animation
1987 introductions